Squash competitions at the 2011 Pan American Games in Guadalajara  was held from October 15 to October 20 at the Squash Complex.

Medal summary

Medal table

Events

Men's events

Women's events

Qualification

Qualification was done at the 2010 Pan American Championship in Guatemala City, Guatemala. A maximum of sixty athletes competed at the squash competition. There were a maximum of 35 male and 25 female competitors total. Each nation could enter a maximum of three male and female athletes, for a total of six athletes. Of these athletes, two will compete in the individual events per gender, one pair competed in doubles per gender, and three competed in a team in the team event per gender. The top seven nations at the 2010 Pan American Squash Championship could qualify women's teams, while the top ten nations could qualify men's teams. Mexico qualified a men's and women's team as the host nation. Outside of this, athletes could qualify individually, with a maximum of one female and two male athletes qualifying individually.

References

 
Events at the 2011 Pan American Games
P
2011